Guy Rawstron Branch, EGM (27 October 1913 – 11 August 1940) was a Royal Air Force fighter pilot and one of "The Few". He was killed in action on 11 August 1940. Since his death occurred before the introduction of the George Cross his next-of-kin were not given the opportunity of exchanging the insignia of the Empire Gallantry Medal for the new award.

Early life
Branch was born on 27 October 1913 in London, the son of Charles Churchill Branch and Mary Madelaine Bernadette Branch (née Rawstron). He was educated at Eton College and Balliol College, Oxford. On 7 May 1937 he was commissioned as a pilot officer in the Royal Auxiliary Air Force. On 25 March 1939 in Lewes he married Lady Prudence Mary Pelham, daughter of the 6th Earl of Chichester.

Accident and award
On 8 January 1938 Branch was a student pilot was flying as a passenger in a Hawker Demon with Pilot Officer Crawley when it crashed and burst into flames at RAF Upavon. Branch escaped but then returned to the aircraft to free the trapped pilot and pull him clear. For his actions he was awarded the Empire Gallantry Medal on 25 March 1938, the citation reading:

Battle of Britain
During the Battle of Britain Branch, by then a flying officer, was a Hawker Hurricane pilot with No. 145 Squadron RAF. On 8 August 1940 he was credited with destroying two Junkers Ju 87s. A few days later on 11 August 1940 while flying Hurricane serial number P9251 on a mission to intercept German bombers, a large air battle took place off Cherbourg in which Branch was shot down and killed. 

Branch was buried in the churchyard at Quiberville, France. His name recorded on the Battle of Britain Monument in London, and at the Battle of Britain Memorial, Capel-le-Ferne.

References

1913 births
1940 deaths
Alumni of Balliol College, Oxford
The Few
Burials in France
Royal Air Force officers
People educated at Eton College
Royal Air Force pilots of World War II
English aviators
Royal Air Force personnel killed in World War II
Recipients of the Empire Gallantry Medal
Military personnel from London
Survivors of aviation accidents or incidents